Kyle Hardy Wright (born October 2, 1995) is an American professional baseball pitcher for the Atlanta Braves of Major League Baseball (MLB). He played college baseball at Vanderbilt University. The Braves selected Wright with the fifth overall selection of the 2017 Major League Baseball draft. He made his major league debut in 2018.

Early life
Kyle was born in Huntsville, Alabama, to parents Roger and Belinda Wright. He has an elder brother, Mitchell, and younger brother Trey.

Amateur career
Wright attended Buckhorn High School in New Market, Alabama. As a junior, he went 6–2 with a 0.88 earned run average (ERA) and 75 strikeouts. He committed to Vanderbilt University to play college baseball.

As a freshman at Vanderbilt in 2015, Wright appeared in 29 games with three starts and went 6–1 with a 1.23 ERA, 62 strikeouts and four saves. Wright became a full-time starter in 2016. In 16 starts, he went 8–4 with a 3.09 ERA and 107 strikeouts. After the season, he played for the United States collegiate national team. As a junior in 2017, Wright went 5–6 with a 3.40 ERA and 121 strikeouts.

Professional career

Atlanta Braves
The Atlanta Braves selected Wright with the fifth overall selection of the 2017 Major League Baseball draft. He signed for a $7 million signing bonus on June 16, and was assigned to the GCL Braves. Wright was promoted to the Florida Fire Frogs in August 2017, and finished the season there. In nine games started between the two teams, he was 0–1 with a 2.65 ERA.

Wright received an invitation to spring training at the start of the 2018 season. He began the season with the Mississippi Braves. Wright pitched  innings and recorded a 3.70 ERA alongside 105 strikeouts and 43 walks. On July 30, 2018, Wright was promoted to the Gwinnett Stripers. 

Wright was called up to the major leagues for the first time on September 1, 2018. He was the first player from the 2017 draft class to make it to the majors.  He made his major league debut on September 4 against the Boston Red Sox. He was 0–0 with a 4.50 ERA in six innings pitched.

Wright made the Braves' starting rotation at the start of the 2019 season. He struggled through three starts, and was optioned to Gwinnett on April 13. In the majors, he was 0–3 with an 8.69 ERA in  innings.

In 2020, he was 2–4 with a 5.21	ERA in 38 innings in eight starts. He was ninth in the NL, with 24 walks.  He primarily threw a 94 mph sinker and an 88 mph slider, while also throwing a 95 mph four-seam fastball, 88 mph changeup, and 82 mph curveball. He made his postseason debut in October against the Miami Marlins during the National League Division Series, pitching six innings of shutout ball in the Braves' Game 3 and series-clinching victory. He lasted less than an inning in his sole National League Championship Series start, allowing seven earned runs in Game 3 to the Los Angeles Dodgers.

He spent most of the 2021 regular season with Gwinnett, with which he was 10–5 with a 3.02 ERA in 24 starts in which he pitched 137 innings. He also pitched two starts for the Braves, and was 0–1 with a 9.95 ERA in  innings. On October 26, 2021, it was announced that Wright was added to the Braves roster for the World Series against the Houston Astros.  Wright pitched one inning in Game 2, striking out the side.  Then, in Game 4, he entered the game with one out and the bases loaded in the first inning.  Wright proceeded to work out of the jam with only one inherited runner scoring, then pitched four subsequent innings, allowing only one additional run.  The Braves scored three runs, with successive home runs by Dansby Swanson and Jorge Soler, and won the game, 3–2. Despite only pitching  innings in the regular season, Wright's  innings pitched in the World Series was the second highest among Braves pitchers.

Wright began the 2022 season on the Braves Opening Day roster. On September 24, Wright won his twentieth game of the season, and became the first Braves pitcher since Russ Ortiz in 2003 to reach that milestone. Before the season had begun, Wright had only recorded two career wins. Wright matched Ortiz's 2003 win total on October 1, 2022, and ended the regular season as the major league leader in victories. A Braves pitcher had not led MLB in wins since Tom Glavine's 2000 season.

References

External links

Vanderbilt Commodores bio

1995 births
Living people
Sportspeople from Huntsville, Alabama
Baseball players from Alabama
Major League Baseball pitchers
National League wins champions
Atlanta Braves players
Vanderbilt Commodores baseball players
Gulf Coast Braves players
Florida Fire Frogs players
Mississippi Braves players
Gwinnett Stripers players